Thricolepis is a genus of broad-nosed weevils in the beetle family Curculionidae. There are at least three described species in Thricolepis.

Species
These three species belong to the genus Thricolepis:
 Thricolepis inornata Horn, 1876 i c g b
 Thricolepis seminuda Horn, 1894 i c g
 Thricolepis simulator Horn, 1876 i c g
Data sources: i = ITIS, c = Catalogue of Life, g = GBIF, b = Bugguide.net

References

Further reading

 
 
 
 

Entiminae
Articles created by Qbugbot